Chopoqlu (also Romanized as Chopoqlū and Chepeqlū; also known as Chābūglū, Chapalū, Chopeglū, and Chopogh Loo) is a village in Sardrud-e Olya Rural District, Sardrud District, Razan County, Hamadan Province, Iran. At the 2006 census, its population was 430, in 105 families.

References 

Populated places in Razan County